The Chet Ton dynasty (meaning "the dynasty of the seven lords"), also spelled Jedton, or officially Thipphachakkrathiwong dynasty or Thipphachak dynasty in the Royal Society of Thailand's spelling style or Dibayachakkradhiwongse dynasty in Prajadhipok's spelling style is a dynasty that ruled three northern states of Siam, which consisted of Chiang Mai, the largest, Lampang and Lamphun.

History 

It was established towards the end of the reign of King Thai Sa of Ayutthaya by Thipchang of Nan, a mahout and woodsman who was appointed ruler of Lampang City for good military deeds. Afterwards his grandson, urged by King Kavila, helped restore southern Lanna with the help of the royal army of King Taksin the Great of Thonburi.

The Chet Ton dynasty is noted for having formed ties with other older Lannanese dynasties such as the Mangrai and Chiengsaen dynasties of which King Mangrai the Great and Phya Ngammuang were respective members thereby incorporating them into the dynasty through marriage.

Moreover, many female members of the Chet Ton dynasty intermarried with members of the Chakri dynasty; two such worth noting are Princess Sri Anocha, sister of King Kawila of Chiang Mai and wife of Maha Sura Singhanat who was the younger brother and right hand of the first monarch of the Chakri dynasty of Siam, and Princess Dara Rasmi, daughter of King Inthawichayanon of Chiang Mai and one of the princess consorts of Chulalongkorn, King Rama V of Siam. It is held that such a bond between the two dynasties, forged since the dawn of the Bangkok Era, proved to help ease the transition of Lanna into the lands of Siam proper.

Seven lords of Thipchang
 Kawila (กาวิละ), 3rd Ruler of Lampang and 1st Ruler of Chiangmai
 Khamsom (คำสม), 4th Ruler of Lampang
 Thammalangka (ธัมลังกา), 2nd Ruler of Chiangmai
 Duangthip (ดวงทิพย์), 5th Ruler of Lampang
 Moolah (หมูหล้า), Viceroy of Lampang
 Khamfan (คำฟั่น), 1st Ruler of Lamphun and 3rd Ruler of Chiangmai
 Boonma (บุญมา), 2nd Ruler of Lamphun

References 

The Chronicles of Chiang Mai Ed.2, trans. David K. Wyatt and Aroonrat Wichienkaeo, Chiang Mai: Silkworm Books, 1998, pp141–157 
Ongsakul, Sarassawadee, History of Lanna, trans. Chitraporn Tanratanakul, Chiang Mai: Silkworm Books, Thai text 2001, English text 2005, pp129–143 
Suryadinata, L. (2012). Southeast Asian Personalities of Chinese Descent: A Biographical Dictionary, Volume I & II. Institute of Southeast Asian Studies.

 
Lan Na royalty
1770s in Thailand
18th century in Siam
19th century in Siam
20th century in Thailand
21st century in Thailand
1782 establishments in Siam
1953 establishments in Thailand